This is a list of server-side JavaScript implementations.

Server-side JavaScript use 

Other common server-side programming languages are JavaServer Pages (JSP), Active Server Pages (ASP), Perl, PHP, Python, Ruby, ColdFusion, and others.

See also

References

External links
The Server-Side JavaScript Google Group dedicated to creating cross-platform SSJS standard APIs.
Mozilla JavaScript shells especially section "Standalone JavaScript shells"

JavaScript
Server-side JavaScript implementations
Server-side JavaScript implementations